Gato or El Gato is a nickname or given name that may refer to
Given name
Gato Dumas (1938–2004), Argentine chef 
Gato Eveready (Víctor Manuel Soto Flores, born 1975), Mexican professional wrestler, known as "El Gato"
Gato Barbieri (1932-2016), Argentinian jazz tenor saxophonist and composer

Nickname
Edgardo Obregón (born 1999), football prodigy from Mexico, nicknamed "Gato"
Gastón Gaudio (born 1978), Argentinian tennis player, nicknamed "El Gato"
Orlando Melendez (born 1979), Puerto Rico-born basketball player for the Harlem Globetrotters, nicknamed "El Gato"
Pat Tanaka (born 1961), Hawaiian wrestler who has used the ring name "El Gato"